Antonio de Almeida is the name of:

 Antonio de Almeida (conductor) (1928–1997), French conductor
 António José de Almeida (1866–1929), sixth president of Portugal
Antonio de Almeida e Costa (1932–2010), Portuguese naval officer and politician
António de Almeida Santos (1926–2016), Portuguese politician